

The Bleriot-SPAD S.30 was a French racer aircraft built in the early 1920s.

Design
The S.31 was a biplane with a monocoque fuselage of wood and canvas construction, as well as floats. It was built to participate in the 1920 Schneider Cup.

Specifications

See also

References

SPAD aircraft
Biplanes
Single-engined tractor aircraft
Aircraft first flown in 1920